Anthony Vito Recker (born August 29, 1983) is an American former professional baseball catcher and first baseman. He previously played in Major League Baseball (MLB) for the Oakland Athletics, Chicago Cubs, New York Mets, and Atlanta Braves.

Baseball career

Amateur career
Born in Allentown, Pennsylvania, Recker was raised by mother Alicia and stepfather Kip. He attended Catasauqua High School, where he also played football and basketball, and later continued his baseball career at Alvernia College, a small NCAA Division III school in Reading, Pennsylvania. One of Recker's college teammates was Zach Lutz, and the pair were coached by Lutz's father. While playing for the Crusaders, Recker spent some time on the mound, where he occasionally threw a knuckleball. Despite growing up in Pennsylvania, Recker's favorite team was the Oakland Athletics.

Oakland Athletics
Recker was drafted by the Oakland Athletics in the 18th round of the 2005 Major League Baseball Draft out of Alvernia College. He began catching and, on occasion, playing first base professionally.

On August 23, 2011, he was promoted to the major leagues for the first time. He was named to the Triple-A All-PCL Team in 2011, a season in which he powered 16 home runs for the Sacramento River Cats. He made the Athletics' 2012 Opening Day roster, but was optioned to the minor leagues in May.

Chicago Cubs

Recker was traded to the Cubs for Blake Lalli on August 27, 2012. He appeared in 9 games, in the last few weeks of that season.

New York Mets
On October 24, 2012, Recker was designated for assignment. He was claimed off waivers by the New York Mets the next day.

Recker made the Mets' 2013 Opening Day roster as a backup catcher. Although Recker is a position player, he pitched the ninth inning for the New York Mets to preserve their regular pitchers in a lopsided game on June 30, 2013, where the Mets were defeated by the Washington Nationals by a score of 13-2. The last position player to pitch for the Mets before Recker did so was catcher Rob Johnson on May 18, 2012. He was optioned to the Triple-A Las Vegas 51s on August 19. He was recalled on August 28, as a backup to Travis d'Arnaud, due to the trade that sent catcher John Buck and outfielder Marlon Byrd to the Pittsburgh Pirates.

Recker made the Opening Day roster in 2014 as a backup catcher to d'Arnaud. On April 12, Recker hit a solo home run in the top of the 13th off Matt Shoemaker to break the 6-6 tie between the Mets and Angels and win the game for the Mets 7-6.

After an early-season injury to d'Arnaud in 2015, the Mets kept Recker as a backup catcher, and promoted prospect Kevin Plawecki to serve as the starter. 
On April 14th, Recker played 3B in an emergency role. 
On May 14, Recker had his first career multi-homer game against the Chicago Cubs, a game that the Mets went on to lose. On November 6, Recker was outrighted off the 40-man roster, making him a free agent. Recker hit .125 with two home runs, five RBIs in 80 at-bats in 32 games in 2015. From 2013 to 2015 as a Met, Recker hit 15 home runs in 140 games. However, Recker did manage to hit 8 home runs in just 108 plate appearances while playing for the Las Vegas 51s. Recker was known for his propensity to hit home runs late in games or in key situations.

Cleveland Indians
On November 27, 2015, Recker signed a minor league contract with the Cleveland Indians, including an invitation to spring training. He appeared in 19 games for the AAA Columbus Clippers, early in the 2016 season.

Atlanta Braves
Recker was traded to the Atlanta Braves on May 9, 2016, for cash considerations, and assigned to the Triple-A Gwinnett Braves. The Braves promoted Recker to the major leagues after an injury to Tyler Flowers that July.

On December 2, 2016, Recker and the Braves avoided salary arbitration by agreeing to an $800,000 contract for the 2017 season. He was initially optioned to Gwinnett at the end of spring training, but eventually was selected as one of the last two players to make the Braves’ 2017 Opening Day roster, alongside Chaz Roe. He had his contract purchased on July 21, 2017.

Minnesota Twins
On July 24, 2017, the Braves traded Recker, Jaime García, and cash considerations to the Minnesota Twins for prospect Huascar Ynoa. The Twins subsequently outrighted Recker to the minor leagues on July 28, 2017. He appeared in 19 games for the AAA Rochester Red Wings, that year. He elected free agency on October 10, 2017.

Arizona Diamondbacks
On March 5, 2018, Recker signed a minor-league contract with the Arizona Diamondbacks, which included an invitation to spring training. He spent the season in AAA, catching in 66 of the 74 games in which he appeared for the Reno Aces. He elected free agency on November 3, 2018.

Personal life
Recker married Kelly Shepardson on November 2, 2013. His wife Kelly gave birth to their first child, Camden Anthony Recker, on December 29, 2014. They also have a younger son, Grady. He recently became an analyst on the Mets' network SNY and has filled in for Keith Hernandez and Ron Darling in the booth with Gary Cohen. "In early 2019, I decided [playing baseball] wasn’t the right thing for me to do anymore," he told The Morning Call in April 2020. "As soon as I made that decision, I quickly turned my gaze toward the TV world. It was something I liked doing and I already had a little bit of experience" from working the David Wright finale in September 2018.

References

External links

1983 births
Living people
Alvernia Golden Wolves baseball players
American expatriate baseball players in Canada
Atlanta Braves players
Baseball players from Pennsylvania
Catasauqua High School alumni
Chicago Cubs players
Columbus Clippers players
Gwinnett Braves players
Iowa Cubs players
Kane County Cougars players
Leones del Escogido players
American expatriate baseball players in the Dominican Republic
Las Vegas 51s players
Major League Baseball catchers
Midland RockHounds players
New York Mets players
Oakland Athletics players
Reno Aces players
Rochester Red Wings players
Sacramento River Cats players
Sportspeople from Allentown, Pennsylvania
Stockton Ports players
Tennessee Smokies players
Vancouver Canadians players